The 2013 Sparta Prague Open was a professional tennis tournament played on outdoor clay courts. It was the fourth edition of the tournament which was part of the 2013 ITF Women's Circuit, offering a total of $100,000 in prize money. It took place in Prague, Czech Republic, from 13 to 19 May 2013.

WTA entrants

Seeds 

 1 Rankings as of 6 May 2013

Other entrants 
The following players received wildcards into the singles main draw:
  Lucie Hradecká
  Anna Karolína Schmiedlová
  Kateřina Siniaková
  Tereza Smitková

The following players received entry from the qualifying draw:
  Gabriela Dabrowski
  Bernarda Pera
  Ana Vrljić
  Sandra Záhlavová

The following player received entry by a Special Exempt:
  Barbora Záhlavová-Strýcová

Champions

Singles 

  Lucie Šafářová def.  Alexandra Cadanțu 3–6, 6–1, 6–1

Doubles 

  Renata Voráčová /  Barbora Záhlavová-Strýcová def.  Irina Falconi /  Eva Hrdinová 6–4, 6–0

External links 
 2013 Sparta Prague Open at ITFtennis.com
 

Sparta Prague Open
Clay court tennis tournaments
WTA Prague Open
2013 in Czech tennis